"Chapter Six: Listen With Your Ears, React With Your Face" is the sixth episode of the first season of the American dark comedy crime television series Barry. The episode was written by producer Emily Heller, and directed by Hiro Murai. It was first broadcast on HBO in the United States on April 29, 2018.

The series follows Barry Berkman, a hitman from Cleveland who travels to Los Angeles to kill someone but finds himself joining an acting class taught by Gene Cousineau, where he meets aspiring actress Sally Reed and begins to question his path in life as he deals with his criminal associates such as Monroe Fuches and NoHo Hank. In the episode, Barry has to deal with the consequences of letting Taylor live while being pressured by Fuches to kill him. To complicate matters, the police start closing in on him while one of Pazar's henchmen goes after Barry for revenge.

According to Nielsen Media Research, the episode was seen by an estimated 0.560 million household viewers and gained a 0.2 ratings share among adults aged 18–49. The episode received critical acclaim, with critics praising the writing, directing, performances, tension and cliffhanger.

Plot
Barry (Bill Hader) and Fuches (Stephen Root) are surveying a desert airstrip with the help of Taylor (Dale Pavinski), planning to intercept Bolivian Drug Lord Cristobal Sifuentes' arrival. During this, Fuches expresses his distate of Taylor to Barry, telling him he made a huge mistake by not killing him.

The morning after having sex, Moss (Paula Newsome) tells Gene (Henry Winkler) that they must end their relationship, as she feels it will interfere with her investigation. Meanwhile, Pazar (Glenn Fleshler) and Hank (Anthony Carrigan) check the stash house massacre, praising Barry's actions. Pazar's employee, Vacha (Mark Ivanir), tells Pazar about Sally (Sarah Goldberg) and her connection to Barry, but Pazar tells him to stop pursuing Barry, despite Barry having killed Vacha's brother. 

Barry hangs out with Taylor at his apartment, who is comfortable watching pornography with Barry. Barry suggests that Taylor could work for Fuches while he quits his hitman life, but Taylor refuses and even gets mad at the amount of money that Fuches gets from Barry, telling Barry he should kill Fuches. He also gives Barry part of the money he recovered from the stash house. Barry refuses to take the money as it is related to money laundering. While Barry goes to the bathroom (once again daydreaming about his future children), Taylor places the money in Barry's backpack.

At the acting class, Barry apologizes to the class for his outburst, but they assure him that they were at fault for being unaware of his feelings. As the class begins, Barry is surprised to find the money in his backpack and hurriedly hides it in the bathroom ceiling. He then performs a Macbeth scene with Sally, which is going poorly. To improve his delivery, Gene has Barry and Sally repeatedly say "I love you" to each other, making them change their tones. After the class ends, Barry is frustrated with the constant messages from Taylor.  Barry personally calls him, telling him that he will do the airstrip job by himself. Taylor just says "okay". Meanwhile, Moss starts thinking about her relationship with Gene and decides to drop the case, much to the excitement of her partners.

That night, Sally asks Gene for a new role in the play to help her challenge herself and he ends up agreeing. During this, Vacha sneaks into the class to find Sally, running into Moss, who wanted to see Gene to rekindle their relationship. Moss notes Vacha's Russian accent, prompting him to flee the area and she gives chase. Vacha opens fire with a rifle, but Moss manages to kill him after a tense shootout. While securing and investigating the crime scene, Gene arrives and is confused, eventually being told by Moss to leave the scene. The police also discover the hidden money from the bathroom. 

The next day, Barry bumps into Taylor, fully dressed in his military uniform. He is further shocked to see that Taylor has brought in Chris (Chris Marquette) and Vaughn (Marcus Brown) to help them in the airstrip attack, having felt inspired by Gene's acting book. A panicked Barry tries to get Chris out of the vehicle as he is unaware of the attack but Chris chooses to stay. Taylor ignores Barry's warnings to follow the safer route and drives straight toward the Bolivians, who are already in the scene. As they approach, their car is gunned down, with the bullets hitting Taylor and Vaughn and the car starting to spiral out of control.

Production

Development
In February 2018, the episode's title was revealed as "Chapter Six: Listen With Your Ears, React With Your Face" and it was announced that producer Emily Heller had written the episode while Hiro Murai had directed it. This was Heller's first writing credit, and Murai's second directing credit.

Reception

Viewers
The episode was watched by 0.560 million viewers, earning a 0.2 in the 18-49 rating demographics on the Nielson ratings scale. This means that 0.2 percent of all households with televisions watched the episode. This was a 13% decrease from the previous episode, which was watched by 0.643 million viewers with a 0.2 in the 18-49 demographics.

Critical reviews
"Chapter Six: Listen With Your Ears, React With Your Face" received critical acclaim. Vikram Murthi of The A.V. Club gave the episode an "A" and wrote, "'Chapter 6: Listen With Your Ears, React With Your Face' is the everything-begins-to-unravel episode of the season, in which the walls start to slowly close in on our hero. Yet, Barry makes some interesting choices for such a now-standard episode of TV. For one thing, the show takes its sweet time before it lets the proverbial shit hit the fan. Most of the episode follows Barry tip-toeing around Taylor or acting class drama, but by the end of the episode, the LAPD are closer to Barry than ever, and Taylor takes control of Barry's mission. Credited writer Emily Heller lulls the audience into a false sense of security before letting the action take over." 

Nick Harley of Den of Geek wrote, "Once again, Barry moves toward darker material and gives us a cliffhanger that has me resisting immediately firing up the next episode. I have to assume Barry will get out of this situation unscathed, but how will potentially losing his friend Chris affect him? Will the rage then send him after Fuches? Will the Bolivian connection finally put him in Moss’ crosshairs? The fact that a half-hour series that was pitched as a comedy has me asking all of these questions proves we're dealing with something truly unique and special here." Charles Bramesco of Vulture gave the episode a 4 star rating out of 5 and wrote, "For all its absurd humor and Jarmuschian flights of stagnant ennui, Barry remains at its heart a morality play about the immorality of people who put on plays. Barry now has a few innocent lives on his hands, most troublingly the friend with a wife and kid who thought they were all going into the desert to do a little light intimidation."

References

External links
 "Chapter Six: Listen With Your Ears, React With Your Face" at HBO
 

Barry (TV series) episodes
2018 American television episodes
Television episodes directed by Hiro Murai